Surface element may refer to
An infinitesimal portion of a 2D surface, as used in a surface integral in a 3D space.
The volume form of a 2D manifold
Surfel in 3D computer graphics
Differential (infinitesimal), an infinitesimal portion of a surface